Schenck v. Pro-Choice Network of Western New York, 519 U.S. 357 (1997), was a case heard before the United States Supreme Court related to legal protection of access to abortion. The question before the court was whether the First Amendment was violated by placing an injunction on protesters outside abortion clinics. The court ruled in a 6–3 decision that "floating buffer zones" preventing protesters approaching people entering or leaving the clinics were unconstitutional, though "fixed buffer zones" around the clinics themselves remained constitutional. The Court's upholding the fixed buffer was the most important aspect of the ruling, because it was a common feature of injunctions nationwide.

Paul Schenck challenged a Federal District Court injunction that restricted "sidewalk counselors" from approaching abortion clinic patients and others with Bibles, tracts and anti-abortion messages. Because these protesters often violently harassed and intimidated patients and staff or prevented them from entering the clinic, the Court upheld the fixed buffer zone around the clinics, although it struck down the floating buffer zone around individuals because its indefinite and movable nature made it difficult to administer and risked overly restricting free speech.

See also
 List of United States Supreme Court cases, volume 519
 List of United States Supreme Court cases
 Lists of United States Supreme Court cases by volume

References

Further reading

External links
 
PBS NewsHour: "Drawing the Line"

United States Supreme Court cases
United States abortion case law
1997 in United States case law
United States Free Speech Clause case law
United States Supreme Court cases of the Rehnquist Court